Zasieki  is a village in the administrative district of Gmina Brody, within Żary County, Lubusz Voivodeship, in western Poland, close to the German border.

It lies on the Nysa Łużycka river opposite the German city of Forst. Before World War II the village was known as Berge and was part of the city of Forst. A road and railroad border crossing is located in Zasieki.

The village has a population of 300.

References

External links 
 Jewish Community in Zasieki on Virtual Shtetl

Zasieki
Germany–Poland border crossings
Divided cities